Aly Ndiaye, also known as Webster (born December 15, 1979, in Quebec City, Quebec) is a Canadian hip hop artist, TV show host and historian.

Biography 
Ndiaye was born in La Cité-Limoilou borough of Quebec City. He is the son of a Senegalese father and a French-Canadian mother. The latter taught political sciences at Cégep Garneau.

References

1979 births
Living people
Black Canadian musicians
21st-century Canadian rappers
Canadian television hosts
Musicians from Quebec City
Writers from Quebec City
20th-century Canadian historians
20th-century Canadian rappers
Université Laval alumni